Oshunia is an extinct genus of prehistoric bony fish that lived during the Albian. Fossils of the genus were found in the Romualdo Formation of the Araripe Basin, northeastern Brazil. Other authors assign a Cenomanian age to the fish.

See also

 Prehistoric fish
 List of prehistoric bony fish

References

Further reading
 S. Wenz and A. W. A. Kellner. 1986. Découverte du premier Ionoscopidae (Pisces, Halecomorphi) sud-américain, Oshunia brevis n.g., n.sp., dans le Crétacé inférieur de la Chapada do Araripe (nord-est du Brésil). Bulletin du Museum national d'historie naturelle. Section C. Sciences de la terre, paleontologie, geologie, mineralogie 8(1):77-88

Ionoscopiformes
Early Cretaceous fish
Prehistoric fish of South America
Early Cretaceous animals of South America
Albian life
Cretaceous Brazil
Fossils of Brazil
Romualdo Formation
Fossil taxa described in 1986
Taxa named by Alexander Kellner